Cristóbal de Moscoso y Montemayor (died 27 January 1749 in Madrid), also known as the Count de las Torres, was a Spanish noble and military officer.

He was the first Count of Las Torres de Alcorrín (1683). King Philip V of Spain made him Viceroy of Valencia in 1706, where he fought without success against the Allies.
 
In 1723, he became Viceroy of Navarre.

In 1727, he led the Spanish troops in the unsuccessful Thirteenth Siege of Gibraltar. Despite the failure, he was made Marquis de Cullera, and in 1728, Duke d’Algete and a Grandee of Spain.

Notes

References

Primary sources
Enciclopedia Catalana
S.H. (Anon.), Journal of the Siege of Gibraltar (Gibraltar Museum Manuscripts: 1728)

Secondary sources
 Browning, Reed. The Duke of Newcastle. Yale University Press, 1975.
 Fernández Duro, Cesáreo. Armada española desde la unión de los reinos de Castilla y de León, tomo VI. Sucesores de Rivadeneyra, 1902.
 Hills, George: The Rock of Contention: A History of Gibraltar (London: Robert Hale and Company, 1974).
 Jackson, Sir William G.F.: The Rock of the Gibraltarians: A History of Gibraltar (Gibraltar: Gibraltar Books Ltd., 2001)
 Kenyon, E.R., Gibraltar under Moor, Spaniard and Briton (London: Methuen and Co. Ltd., 1938).
 Ledesma Miranda, Ramón: Gibraltar, la Roca de Calpe, Ediciones del Movimiento, 1957
 Sayer, Frederick: The history of Gibraltar and of its political relation to events in Europe, from the Commencement of the Moorish dynasty in Spain to the last Morocco war: with original and unpublished letters from the Prince of Hesse, Sir George Eliott, the Duc de Crillon, Collingwood, and Lord Nelson, and an ..., Saunders, 1862
Simms, Brendan. Three Victories and a Defeat: The Rise and Fall of the First British Empire. Penguin Books, 2008.
 Solas Dodd, James: The ancient and modern history of Gibraltar. With an accurate journal of the siege of that fortress, Feb. 13 to June 23, 1727. Tr. from the Spanish, 1781
 Maria Montero, Francisco: Historia de Gibraltar y de su campo, Imprenta de la Revista Médica, 1860
 Maria Monti, Ángel: Historia de Gibraltar: dedicada a SS. AA. RR., los serenisimos señores Infantes Duques de Montpensier, Imp. Juan Moyano, 1852

Catalan nobility
1749 deaths
18th-century Spanish military personnel
Viceroys of Navarre
1660 births